A referendum on Chile's independence was held on 15 November 1817.  After the Battle of Chacabuco, Bernardo O'Higgins was appointed director supremo. He held a plebiscite to test the popular will.  This independence proposal passed with a large majority.  His political program confirmed, O'Higgins's administration declared independence on 16 February 1818.

References

Referendums in Chile
1817 referendums
Referendum
1817 elections in South America
Chile
November 1817 events